Miguel Ángel Sansores Sánchez (born 28 April 1991), also known as El Yuca, is a Mexican professional footballer who plays as a forward for Liga MX club Mazatlán.

Club career
Sansores made his Monarcas Morelia debut on April 14, 2010, at 18 years as a substitute in a match against Chiapas in a 2 - 1 loss of Monarcas.

Honours
Morelia
Supercopa MX: 2014

References

External links

Footballers from Yucatán
Sportspeople from Mérida, Yucatán
1991 births
Living people
Atlético Morelia players
C.F. Mérida footballers
Toros Neza footballers
Liga MX players
Association football forwards
Mexican footballers